Christos Laios (born 23 July 1972) is a retired Greek football midfielder.

References

1972 births
Living people
Greek footballers
Apollon Smyrnis F.C. players
Panetolikos F.C. players
Thyella Patras F.C. players
Super League Greece players
Association football midfielders
Footballers from Agrinio